Jan Mittlöhner (1902–?) was a Czechoslovak soldier and skier. He competed in military ski patrol at the 1924 Winter Olympics in Chamonix, where the Czechoslovak team placed fourth.

References

1902 births
Year of death missing
Czechoslovak military patrol (sport) runners
Olympic biathletes of Czechoslovakia
Military patrol competitors at the 1924 Winter Olympics